Jerry Michael Dunn (born May 6, 1953) is an American college basketball coach who was most recently the head coach at Tuskegee. Dunn is a former men's basketball assistant coach at the University of Michigan, who held the title of Associate Head Coach. He previously held the same position at West Virginia University, but followed head coach John Beilein to Michigan after the 2006–2007 season. Dunn served as the head coach of  Penn State Nittany Lions basketball from 1995 to 2003. His twin brother Terry Dunn was the head coach at Dartmouth Big Green men's basketball from 2004–05 to 2009–10.

Early life and education
Born in Raleigh, North Carolina, Dunn moved to Washington, D. C. with his family at age 13, then to Fort Dix, New Jersey three years later when his stepfather, a United States Army officer, was assigned there. Dunn graduated from Pemberton Township High School in 1971.

He then moved to Casper, Wyoming to attend Casper Junior College and played one season of basketball in the 1973–74 season before tendonitis ended his playing career. After completing his associate degree, Dunn returned to Washington, D. C. to work for the federal government. Dunn then enrolled at nearby George Mason University in 1978 and graduated in 1981 with a bachelor's degree in health and physical education with a minor in history.

Coaching career
Dunn is a graduate of George Mason University, where he was a player and assistant coach from 1977 to 1983.

After 13 seasons as an assistant under  Penn State  head coach Bruce Parkhill, Dunn served as the head coach at Penn State from 1995 to 2003. Coach Dunn led his team to its first Top Ten ranking and the 1996 NCAA Tournament. In 2001, he led Penn State to the Big Ten Tournament semi-finals and to a number 7 seed in the NCAA Tournament; Penn State beat number 2 seed, North Carolina, to advance to the Sweet Sixteen for the first time in over half a century. Coach Dunn reached 50 wins and 100 wins faster than any other head men's basketball coach in Penn State history.

Dunn served as an assistant coach on John Beilein's staff at West Virginia from 2003 to 2007.  He followed Beilein to the University of Michigan when Beilein was hired as the Michigan head basketball coach. On December 29, 2009, Dunn took an indefinite leave of absence from Michigan due to personal matters.

Prior to becoming head coach at Tuskegee, Jerry Dunn was Assistant Coach Player Development for the New York Knicks.

On May 15, 2019, Tuskegee announced that it would not be renewing Dunn's contract.

Head coaching record

References

External links
 Tuskegee profile

1953 births
Living people
American men's basketball players
Basketball coaches from North Carolina
Basketball players from Raleigh, North Carolina
Casper Thunderbirds men's basketball players
College men's basketball head coaches in the United States
George Mason Patriots men's basketball coaches
George Mason University alumni
Michigan Wolverines men's basketball coaches
New York Knicks assistant coaches
Penn State Nittany Lions basketball coaches
People from Pemberton Township, New Jersey
Sportspeople from Raleigh, North Carolina
Tuskegee Golden Tigers men's basketball coaches
West Virginia Mountaineers men's basketball coaches